INS Betwa (F39) is a  guided missile frigate currently in service with the Indian Navy. The ship is named for the Betwa River.

Operations

Operation Sukoon
Betwa was a part of Task Force 54, returning from the Mediterranean, when the 2006 Israel-Lebanon Conflict broke out. As a part of Operation Sukoon, Betwa participated in the evacuation of Indian citizens from Lebanon to Cyprus.

Cyclone Tauktae Rescue Operations
The ship took part in search and rescue operations in the wake of Cyclone Tauktae in May 2021.

Incidents 

On 4 January 2014, the ship hit an unidentified object underwater and cracked the sonar dome, and had also seen salt water ingress into sensitive equipment.

On 5 December 2016, Betwa slipped off support blocks and over onto its port side when refloating and undocking inside the cruiser graving dock at the Naval Dockyard in Mumbai during refit repairs, killing 2 sailors and injuring 15 others. The ship's main mast was also damaged. 

Sources initially reported that the salvage and repair of the ship would take approximately two years. Resolve Marine Engineering, a US-based firm, was contracted to salvage the flooded vessel in January 2017 for a sum of Rs. 20 Crore (200 million Indian Rupees, approximately USD 3 million at the time).

On 22 February 2017, it was reported that the ship was made upright and refloated. Betwa was restored to an upright position by the US salvage company by systematically flooding and pumping her compartments without using any external lifting mechanisms.
Three Naval Officers were court martialed and found guilty of negligence.

It was reported on 10 January 2021 that a 22 year old sailor on the ship died from a bullet injury, allegedly due to suicide.

References

1998 ships
Brahmaputra-class frigates
Frigates of the Indian Navy
Training ships of the Indian Navy
Ships built in India
Maritime incidents in 2016